State Route 844 (SR 844) is a  state route that runs between Beavercreek and Wright-Patterson Air Force Base in the US state of Ohio. The north–south signed route is a spur freeway which mainly passes through government-owned properties. For some of its path, SR 844 passes through Wright State University. The highway was first signed in 1995 on the same alignment as today. SR 844 replaced the SR 444A designation of the highway, which dated back to 1989.

Route description

The highway is maintained by the Ohio Department of Transportation (ODOT). SR 844 begins at a partial interchange with Interstate 675 (I-675). The route heads northeast as a four-lane controlled-access highway, passing under North Fairfield Road. The road has a partial interchange with Colonel Glenn Highway, before passing on the southeast and east sides of Wright State University. The highway curves due north, having an interchange with University Boulevard. After the interchange with University Boulevard, the road curves northwest, passing over SR 444. Followed by an interchange with SR 444, SR 844 ends at Gate 15A of Wright-Patterson Air Force Base.

SR 844 is signed as "McClernon Memorial Skyway", after the late Brigadier General Glen J. McClernon. McClernon had been base commander during the time the university was being established—partially on land deeded to it by the Air Force base—and also had been a two-term mayor of Fairborn.

History
SR 844 was originally SR 444A, which opened by 1989. After a public comment period in 1994, ODOT changed the number to "844" by 1995. Although legally designated as "McClernon-Skyway Memorial Drive" on September 22, 1989, SR 844 is both signed and recognized by the state as "McClernon Memorial Skyway".

Future
There are plans to add a ramp from northbound SR 844 to northbound SR 444, and to add a ramp from northbound SR 444 to southbound SR 844. As of October 2013, the status and funding for this project are unknown.

Major junctions

References

External links

844
Wright-Patterson Air Force Base
Freeways in the United States
Beavercreek, Ohio
Transportation in Greene County, Ohio
1989 establishments in Ohio